Kate Bowler (born 1980) is a Canadian academic and writer from Winnipeg, Manitoba. Bowler is currently an associate professor of the history of Christianity in North America at Duke Divinity School. She is the author of Blessed: A History of the American Prosperity Gospel (Oxford University Press, 2013) and Everything Happens for a Reason (and Other Lies I've Loved) (Random House, 2018), which was a New York Times hardcover nonfiction best seller. In her podcast, Everything Happens, she talks with others about their dark times and what they've learned.

Biography 
Bowler was born in 1980 in London, where her father was pursuing a PhD in history at King's College London. She spent most of her childhood in Winnipeg, Manitoba and received her Bachelor of Arts at Macalester College in St Paul, Minnesota, and her Master of Arts in Religion at Yale Divinity School. She completed her PhD at Duke University which focuses on the history of prosperity gospel in the United States.

Raised by parents who worked in academia and with a research interest in Father Christmas, her family had a strong tradition of celebrating Christmas.

Her monograph published in 2020,The Preacher's Wife: Women and Power in American Megaministry, was a product of the sabbatical grant for researchers from The Louisville Institute.

Personal life 
Bowler married Toban Penner, her high school classmate, in 2002. Together they have a son, Zach.

In 2015, she was diagnosed with stage IV cancer with no family history of cancer. Her memoir, Everything Happens for a Reason (and Other Lies I've Loved), was published in 2018, and the book was listed as hardcover nonfiction best seller on New York Times for 5 weeks.

Writings 

 Blessed: A History of the American Prosperity Gospel. New York: Oxford University Press, 2013. 
 Everything Happens for a Reason: And Other Lies I've Loved. New York: Random House, 2018. 
 The Preacher's Wife: The Precarious Power of Evangelical Women Celebrities. Princeton: Princeton University Press, 2020. 
No Cure for Being Human (And Other Truths I Need to Hear). Penguin, 2021. 
The Lives We Actually Have: 100 Blessings for Imperfect Days Convergent Books, 2023.

References

External links
 

1980 births
21st-century Canadian historians
Canadian historians of religion
Canadian women historians
Duke Divinity School faculty
Duke University alumni
Living people
Macalester College alumni
Writers from Durham, North Carolina
Writers from Winnipeg
Yale Divinity School alumni